Sergey Lopatin (born 3 April 1961) is a Russian heavyweight weightlifter. Competing in the masters category, he won two world titles in the years 2003 and 2004, placing second in 2002, 2008 and 2011.

Lopatin took up weightlifting in 1974 and around 1980 was a member of the Soviet junior team. He then semi-retired, and returned to weightlifting in 1999, aged 38. He lives in Zheleznogorsk, where he works as a weightlifting coach and serves as a member of the city council.

References

1961 births
Living people
Russian male weightlifters
20th-century Russian people
21st-century Russian people